The Precision Shoulder-fired Rocket Launcher-1 also known as the (PSRL-1) is a modified American clone of the Soviet/Russian RPG-7 shoulder-fired rocket-propelled grenade launcher developed by AirTronic USA. The PSRL-1 is primarily manufactured for US-allied nations who are accustomed to Soviet-style weapons and international export.

History
In 2009, the American company AirTronic USA revealed their modernized version of the RPG-7, named the RPG-7USA, which was later developed into the PSRL-1. The weapon was a Program of Record in the United States Special Operations Command by 2015, and the PSRL-1 entered production by mid-2016.

The first confirmed sales were made to the Armed Forces of Ukraine in 2017. Ukrainian troops used it for the first time in a conflict during the 2022 Russian invasion of Ukraine. At least one was captured by Russian forces.

The PSRL-1 was adopted by the Peruvian Army.

Specifications 
Like the RPG-7USA, the PSRL-1 is fitted with a MIL-STD-1913 quad-rail for mounting accessories, is compatible with mil-spec M4 carbine–style pistol grips and stocks, and is backwards compatible with all existing RPG-7 ammunition. The PSRL-1 is typically equipped with a proprietary 3.5× optical sight with an illuminated etched reticle, or an EOTech sight with a holographic reticle.

Compared to the RPG-7V2, the PSRL-1 is made of 4140/4150 ordnance-grade steel for a longer 1,000-round lifespan, is slightly lighter at  unloaded without optics, and can separate into two pieces for compact carry.

Ammunition

Although Airtronic launchers are compatible with Soviet RPG-7 rocket ammunition, AirTronic also manufactures their own modernized RPG-7 rocket ammunition within the United States, and fully owns the intellectual property of their rocket ammunition.

Improvements have been made focusing on the fuzing, reliability, robustness, and manufacturing quality per United States Department of Defense standards. The warhead fuze features a dual safe and arm arrangement for improved handling safety, and the rocket motor ignitor fuze has been redesigned to improve motor ignition reliability. AirTronic recommends the use of their ammunition in their launchers to achieve the advertised level of performance.

Inert training variants which match the ballistics of live ammunition are also available, allowing for safe training at a reduced cost. The inert warheads of training variants are filled with marking compound so that the impact of the round can be observed from afar.
 
There are three variants of ammunition:
 SR-H1, a 3.82 kg 93 mm high-explosive anti-tank (HEAT) warhead that is able to penetrate 500 mm rolled homogeneous armor (RHA) and has tracer ability. Its effective range is at 500 m, while maximum range can reach up to 800 m. The fire rate is between 4 to 6 rounds per minute.
 SR-T1, a 3.82 kg 93 mm inert warhead is a training round and cannot penetrate armor, though it does retain tracer ability. Its effective range is at 500 m, while maximum range can reach up to 800 m. The rate of fire is between 4 to 6 rpm.
 SR-T2, a 2.12 kg 70 mm inert warhead is also a training round and cannot penetrate armor, though it does retain tracer ability. Its effective range is at 800 m, while maximum range can reach up to 1,200 m. The rate of fire is between 4 to 6 rpm.

Accessories
In conjunction with the weapon, the complete PSRL system includes different sighting systems, spare parts, slings, cases, ammo bags, and bipods for customization and transport. Additionally, AirTronic offers various optional Cerakote coatings.

Users

References

Anti-tank rockets of the United States
Military equipment introduced in the 2010s
Rocket-propelled grenade launchers